Bankable Productions (previously known as "Ty Ty Baby Productions") is an independent film and television production company founded by former model Tyra Banks who also serves as CEO of the company. According to Bankable Productions, the company strives to entertain broad audiences that span all ages from children to adults.

Projects

Television
 America's Next Top Model (UPN & The CW) (2003–2012; production rights transferred to the separate "The Tyra Banks Company")
 The Tyra Banks Show (syndication & The CW) (2005–2010; co-production with Handprint Entertainment and Telepictures)
 Stylista (The CW) (2008: co-production with Warner Horizon Television)
 True Beauty (ABC) (2009–2010; co-production with Warner Horizon Television and Katalyst Media)

Film
 The Clique (2008)

Web productions
 Fa-Fa-Fa Fashion (2011)

Deal with Warner Bros.
In October 2007 Tyra Banks signed an Exclusive Multiyear Development and Production Deal between Bankable Productions and Warner Bros. Entertainment. Under terms of the multiyear pact, Bankable Productions will create and produce original primetime television series programming via the Studio's Warner Bros. Television (WBTV) and Warner Horizon Television (WHTV) production units, as well as original movies for Warner Premiere, the Studio's direct-to-consumer production arm.

References

External links
Tyra.com
Official Top Model website
The Tyra Show website

Television production companies of the United States
Film production companies of the United States